The New England Indonesian Festival is an annual cultural festival held at Copley Square located in Boston, Massachusetts. The first festival was held on September 14, 2013. It was the first and biggest Indonesian cultural festival ever held in the East Coast area, with more than 5,000 audience and hundreds of performers. 
 
This festival is organized by Permias Massachusetts, an all-student committee, Indonesian community in the New England area, Ministry of Culture and Tourism (Indonesia), Consulate General and the Embassy of the Republic of Indonesia. The festival aims to be a showcase of the exquisite and indigenous culture of Indonesia: from batik and handicraft to traditional dance and food tasting and Indonesia's mainstream entertainment industry.

External links
 New England Indonesian Festival at Copley Square (2013)
New England Indonesian Festival
New England Indonesian Festival Official Website"

2013 establishments in Massachusetts
Asian-American culture in Boston
Festivals in Boston
Indonesian American
Recurring events established in 2013